During the 1979-1980 Milan Associazione Calcio competed in Serie A, Coppa Italia and European Cup.

Summary 

In his third campaign as Chairman Felice Colombo appointed club legend Gianni Rivera as club vice-president and Massimo Giacomini as new head coach who arrives from Udinese and was a former club player from 1966 to 1968. Also, the club transferred in Francesco Romano and Forward Giuseppe Galluzzo from A.C. Reggiana and Lecce respectively. As Incumbent League Champions the team finishes the season in third position several points behind Inter.

In Coppa Italia the squad reaches the 7 points in the first round group stage ahead of A.C. Monza, Pisa and Genoa and one draw with Pescara. Then in Quarterfinals the squad was defeated by Roma with a massive 4–0 at San Siro and a 2–2 draw at Olimpico.

In European Cup the squad was early eliminated by Porto which after a draw at Oporto, could win at San Siro 1-0 thanks to a goal scored by Duda ending a 20 years undefeated streak at home in European competitions for the club.

However, towards the end of the season regarding Totonero, Milan was included in inquiries by authorities: Federal prosecutors appointed several club players (Enrico Albertosi, Giorgio Morini and Stefano Chiodi) also President Felice Colombo too. At the end of the Judicial process the Federal Judges exhibited the fixing matches scandal and sanctioned Colombo with a life ban away of football (later that sentence was reduced by appeal); sanctions included suspensions against Enrico Albertosi, Giorgio Morini and Stefano Chiodi (four years, one year and six months respectively) while the team was relegated to the 1980-81 Serie B (along with Lazio). Owing to the Totonero sanctions the club cancelled the transfers in of Bruno Giordano and Paulo Roberto Falcão. The alleged fixed match in question was a Milan-Lazio disputed on 6 January 1980.

Squad

Transfers

Competitions

Serie A

League table

Result by round

Matches

Coppa Italia

First round

Quarterfinals

European Cup

First round

Statistics

Squad statistics

Players statistics

See also

References

External links 

A.C. Milan seasons
Italian football clubs 1979–80 season